The Most Indecent Obsession is the 1995 greatest hits album by Australian pop group, Indecent Obsession. It is includes tracks from their three studio albums, but excludes the group's highest-charting single in Australia, the 1989 track "Say Goodbye".

The album was issued by MCA Records in Japan, South-east Asia and South Africa only.

The album includes "I Dream of You"; a solo track by the groups band member Richard Hennassey.

Track listing
CD/Cassette (MCD33324)
 "Tell Me Something"	
 "Kiss Me"	
 "I Dream of You" (by Richard Hennassey) 
 "Lady Rain"	
 "Indio"	
 "Fall From Grace"	
 "One Woman Man"	
 "Gentleman Style"
 "Fixing a Broken Heart"	
 "One Bad Dream"	
 "Whispers in the Dark"
 "Come Back To Me"	
 "Rebel With a Cause"

External links
 "The Most Indecent Obsession" by Indecent Obsession at Discogs

References

1995 greatest hits albums
Compilation albums by Australian artists
Indecent Obsession albums